KKHJ-FM (93.1 FM) is a radio station broadcasting an Adult Top 40 format. Licensed to Pago Pago, American Samoa, it serves American Samoa, the only U.S. territory south of the equator.  The station is owned by South Seas Broadcasting, Inc. It originally signed on in November 1999 with a Hot AC format. South Seas Broadcasting is owned by Larry Fuss, Kirk Harnack, Joey Cummings and the estate of Smitty Lutu (Lutu died in 2019).  Joey Cummings in the General Manager.  In September 2017, the station moved from its longtime home in Pago Plaza to the second floor of the Aitulagi Building, on Fagaima Road in Tafuna, near the Pago Pago International Airport.  Transmitting facilities are located atop Mt. Alava, overlooking Pago Harbor, with secondary facilities on Mt. Olotele, overlooking Tafuna (translator K229BG, operating on 93.7 MHz).

The station was assigned the callsign KHJS by the Federal Communications Commission on March 9, 1998. It changed callsigns to KKHJ on May 1, 2000, then to the current KKHJ-FM on June 26, 2007.

Programming 
93KHJ features a 2-person morning show called "Samoan Sunrise", hosted by John Raynar and Keziah ("Sia") Atofau.  The morning show is also telecast on the Island Info Channel, a local cable TV channel.

News 
93KHJ has a 3-person local news team, which is rather unusual for a small-market radio station. Headed by veteran News Director Monica Miller, 93KHJ produces daily newscasts in both English and Samoan.  Newscasts are also heard on sister station WVUV-FM.

Translators

References

External links
 93 KHJ official website
 
 

KHJ
Radio stations established in 1999
Adult top 40 radio stations in the United States
1999 establishments in American Samoa
Pago Pago